The Northern Ireland national under-19 football team also known as Northern Ireland under-19s or Northern Ireland U19s represents Northern Ireland in association football at under-19 level. It is controlled by the Irish Football Association and began under the name of Ireland Youth when the Home Nations first held a round robin of friendly matches in 1948. The same year they entered the first International Youth Tournament, now the UEFA European Under-19 Football Championship. Their best performance was in 1963 when they finished as runner-up. The team evolved into the Northern Ireland under-18 team then the current under-19 team. As well as the UEFA Under-19 Championships the team also enters the annual Milk Cup (currently as an under-20 side). In addition, the team plays regular friendlies, sometimes as an under-20 or under-18 team by agreement of the opposing association.

Competitive record
 Champions  Runners-up  Third Place  Fourth Place

European Championships
 1948–1954 – FIFA Junior Tournament
 1955–1980 – UEFA Junior Tournament
 1981–2001 – UEFA European U-18 Championship
 2002–present – UEFA European U-19 Championship

Honours

Milk Cup Elite Section
 Winners: 1997, 2008, 2009, 2014

Coaches
Coaches of the Northern Ireland youth/under-18/under-19 side include:

Players

Current squad
Players born on or after 1 January 2003 will be eligible until the end of the 2022 UEFA European Under-19 Championship. Names in bold denote players who have been capped by Northern Ireland in a higher age group.

Recent call-ups
The following players have previously been called up to the Northern Ireland under-19 squad and remain eligible.

COVID = Player withdrew due to a positive COVID test or from being in close contact with someone with a positive COVID test.
INJ = Player withdrew from the squad before any games had been played.
PRE = Preliminary squad / standby.
SEN = Player withdrew from the squad due to a call up to the senior team.
SUS = Suspended from national team.
WTD = Withdrew due to other reasons.

See also
 Northern Ireland national football team
 Northern Ireland national under-21 football team
 Northern Ireland national under-17 football team

References

External links
 Fixtures & Results
 Current squad
 UEFA U19 Championship Record

Under 19s
European national under-19 association football teams
Youth association football in Northern Ireland